Sarah Schachner is an American composer and musician who has worked on the scores of films, television series and video games.

Biography 
Schachner grew up in the suburbs of Philadelphia. When she was five, she first started playing piano and then started playing the violin. She kept learning other instruments, such as viola and cello, and played with both family and in an orchestra, as well as a jazz band.

Schachner went to the Berklee College of Music and then moved to Los Angeles. She began to work with composer Brian Tyler, who worked in film and then started writing video game music. Tyler first brought Schachner in to work on Call of Duty: Modern Warfare 3. Schachner said, "I started doing music on the games for him and I realized how much I loved working on games." Since then Schachner has worked on more Call of Duty games such as Infinite Warfare and also worked with Ubisoft on the Far Cry and Assassin's Creed series. Schachner began to incorporate synthesizers with her work on string instruments.

In 2016, Ted Cruz's presidential campaign used one of Schachner's songs, "Lens", without permission. As the composer, she and the performer, along with a licensing firm, sued the Cruz campaign in May 2016 for copyright infringement.

Schachner also contributed to the Cassini Finale Music Project, a commemoration of the Cassini mission to Saturn.

Discography

Film

Other music credits

Television

Video games

Other music credits

References

External links 
 Official site
 

Living people
American women composers
Video game composers
American film score composers
People from Philadelphia
Musicians from Los Angeles
People from Los Angeles
Berklee College of Music alumni
21st-century American women
Year of birth missing (living people)